The Cultana Training Area is an Australian Army training area on northeastern Eyre Peninsula in South Australia between Port Augusta, Whyalla and Iron Knob. It includes the former Baxter Detention Centre. The training area was enlarged in 2014 to accommodate training needs of 1st Brigade and 7th Battalion, Royal Australian Regiment. The lease of the land (from the Government of South Australia) includes provisions for mining access. It also has an Indigenous land use agreement with the Barngarla people.

References

Eyre Peninsula
Australian Army
Military installations in South Australia
Far North (South Australia)